Mono, or Alu, is an Oceanic language of Solomon Islands reported in 1999 to be spoken by 660 people on Treasury Island (Mono proper), 2,270 on Shortland Island (Alu dialect), and 14 on Fauro Island.

Phonology 
Mono-Alu language has been studied extensively by Joel L. Fagan, a researcher for the Department of Linguistics, Research School of Pacific Studies at Australian National University. Their publication, "A Grammatical Analysis of Mono-Alu (Bougainville Straits, Solomon Islands)," is one of the first and only translations and analysis of Mono-Alu language.

Fagan identified the Mono-Alu language as having twenty-eight phonemes. They are made up of nine diphthongs, and five vowels and fourteen consonants that make up the alphabet.

The Alu alphabet 

 The Alu alphabet has 19 letters: A B D E F G H I K L M N O P R S T U V.
 Of these letters, D was seldom used instead of R for euphony's sake, but is used now in new foreign words or names introduced in the language. H generally (not always) is or can be replaced by F.

Pronunciation

Pronunciation of vowels
 'a' is usually pronounced as in flat
 a sometimes pronounced as in fast
 'e' is always pronounced as in ten
 'i' is always pronounced as in tin
 'o' is always pronounced as in not
 'u' is always pronounced as in put

Pronunciation of diphthongs
 ai is pronounced "aye" - e.g. .
 sometimes the letters are pronounced separately
 ei has no equivalent sound in English.
 oi is pronounced "oy" - e.g.  ('shark').
 sometimes the letters are pronounced separately. - e.g.  ('echo').
 ui used as a diphthong - e.g.  ('swallow')
 used separately - e.g.  ('baby') with the exception

Pronunciation of consonants 
Q is not used as is done elsewhere. Here also, the words are written as they are pronounced – e.g. (instead of ), .
  is pronounced as in gang
  is pronounced as in 'ring'
  is pronounced as in 'length'
  is pronounced as in 'wrong'

The other consonants have the same sounds as in English.

 /b/ can also be heard as fricatives [β, v] under certain conditions.
 /ɡ/ can be heard as [ɣ] in free variation,
 /ɾ/ can also be heard as [d] in free variation within word-initial position, or as [dɾ] when following a nasal.

 /u, i/ are heard as glides [w, j] within vowel environments.

Numerals 
The number system of Mono-Alu is very similar to other Austronesian languages. For example, Mono-Alu shares the numbers 'two' and 'five' with the Hawaiian Polynesian language. A number for 'zero' was available in the language, but it was under the same use as the word 'nothing.' Fagan identified numbers from one to ten-thousand in Mono-Alu.

Mono-Alu also made use of ordinal numbers. However, only 'first' is an actual word, where all other successive numbers are a grammatical construct.

Grammar 
Mono-Alu, like many other Austronesian languages, uses two separate pronouns for the first-person plural. One is inclusive, including the listener, and the other is exclusive, not including the listener. There are also no third-person pronouns available in the language. Fagan translated pronouns and their possessives.

Mono-Alu is very specific regarding adverbs and other verb affixes. Verbs can be altered with a prefix, infix, and a suffix.

Mono-Alu grammar also follows rules of gender.

Nouns

Gender of nouns 
There are two ways of indicating differences of gender:

 by different words: - e.g.
  'man' –  'woman'
  'men' –  'women'
  'headman' –  'headwoman'
  'his grandfather' –  'his grandmother'
  'old man' (husband) –  'old woman' (wife)
 by using an ord indicative of sex: – e.g.
  'baby' (male) –  'baby' (female)

In other cases, there is no distinction between masculine, feminine and neuter.

Some exceptions within the rules of Mono-Alu have been discovered.

Two adverbs of place, instead of being written with a double consonant, are written with one only accentuated.

 e.g.  (instead of ) – 'here'
  (instead of ) – 'there'

Instead of the aspirate h, the letter f can be used:

 in verbs preceded by the causative  (or )
 e.g.  (or ) – 'let come'
 in verbs preceded by the prefix  (or ) meaning reciprocity or duality
 e.g.  (or ) - 'mon'
  (or ) - 'I, no' 

There is no word for 'the' in the language.

Articles 
There is no definite article in Alu.

There is no indefinite article such as 'a, an'; it is replaced by the indefinite number  ('one').

References

Languages of the Solomon Islands
Northwest Solomonic languages